Ansair was an Australian bus bodybuilder owned by Ansett Transport Industries and later the Clifford Corporation.

History
Ansair was founded by Reg Ansett in 1945 at Tullamarine, to make bodies for his Ansett Pioneer coaches, as well as manufacture aircraft components for Ansett Airways. It also provided bus bodies for other operators.

In 1987 a plant opened in Kingston, Tasmania, to make bodies for Scania buses used by Metro Tasmania, and in January 1993 a plant opened at East-West Airlines' former Tamworth Airport maintenance facility to make bodies for Scanias used by Sydney Buses.

In August 1995 Ansett Transport Industries sold Ansair to the Clifford Corporation. In September 1995 the Kingston plant closed, followed in 1997 by Tullamarine. Ansair ceased trading in November 1998 when the Clifford Corporation collapsed.

The Tamworth plant was reopened by Jakab Industries to complete an order of Volvo B10BLEs for Sydney Buses, under the Phoenix Bus brand.

References

External links

Bus Australia gallery

Ansett Australia
Bus manufacturers of Australia
Australian companies established in 1945
Australian companies disestablished in 1998